Kahir Rural District is a rural district (dehestan) in the Central District of Konarak County, in Sistan and Baluchestan province, Iran. At the 2006 census, its population was 10,799, in 2,161 families.  The rural district has 33 villages.

References 

Rural Districts of Sistan and Baluchestan Province
Konarak County